Martin Galia (born 12 April 1979) is a Czech handball player for HC Baník Karviná and the Czech national team.

He participated at the 2015 World Men's Handball Championship.

References

External links

1979 births
Living people
Sportspeople from Karviná
Czech male handball players
Expatriate handball players in Poland
Czech expatriate sportspeople in Germany
Czech expatriate sportspeople in Poland
Czech expatriate sportspeople in Sweden
Czech expatriate sportspeople in Switzerland
Handball-Bundesliga players
Frisch Auf Göppingen players
Redbergslids IK players
Czech handball coaches